List of Australian films of 1995 contains a detailed list of films that were created in Australia in the year 1995.

1995

See also 
 1995 in Australia
 1995 in Australian television

References

External links 
 Australian film at the Internet Movie Database

1995
Australian
Films